Joy Giovanni (born January 20, 1978) is an American psychic medium, former actress, glamour model and professional wrestling personality, who is best known for her time with World Wrestling Entertainment, where she worked on its SmackDown! brand. She was the first and only winner of the promotion's Rookie Diva of the Year award.

Professional wrestling career

World Wrestling Entertainment (2004–2005; 2009)
Giovanni participated in World Wrestling Entertainment's 2004 Diva Search and although she finished in third place in the competition, WWE signed her to a contract just a few days after her elimination. Her elimination was aired on the September 13 episode of RAW.

Giovanni debuted for SmackDown! on November 18 as a massage therapist, as Joy Giovanni and also acted as special guest bell ringer. On November 14, Giovanni and Big Show hosted a 'Thanksgiving' party, only to be confronted by Luther Reigns. She was later confronted by Luther Reigns again, who tried to force Joy to go on a date with him, causing Big Show to come down and make the save. Joy got into a catfight with Amy Weber on December 16, after Joy gave John "Bradshaw" Layfield a candy cane. On January 6, 2005 edition of SmackDown!, Joy refused to sign Carlito's petition, resulting in him spitting an apple at her face. On the same episode, Kurt Angle was tricked into walking into Joy's locker room by Amy Weber, only to scare her during her shower which caused her to run out in a towel and into Big Show's arms. He chased Angle to the ring in defense of Joy and attacked him. It was revealed to be a trick by The Cabinet to get Big Show and Angle angry at each other.

Following this, Joy began another feud with the villainous Amy Weber. The two became involved in Big Show's feud with John "Bradshaw" Layfield, with Giovanni serving as a friend and later the on-screen girlfriend of Big Show. The feud included a part on January 13, where Joy was kidnapped and discovered, tied and gagged in JBL's limo trunk by Kurt Angle. 
During this time Joy and Amy were scheduled for a wrestling match at the order of Theodore Long, which started from a backstage catfight between Amy and herself. As Big Show attacked the entire group, Kurt Angle bragged about the whole thing and being the mastermind behind it as well.

On January 20, Kurt Angle was forced to issue an open apology to Joy, but when the Big Show came out, Angle tried to leave the ring only to be get ushered back by The Cabinet. It turned out to be another ploy, as Angle and The Cabinet all attacked Big Show. After Weber's departure from WWE in February 2005, their feud was dropped suddenly and Joy would go on to win the 2005 Rookie Diva of the Year contest at No Way Out after beating out Michelle McCool, Rochelle Loewen, and Lauren Jones. On February 21 at a live event, Joy competed in a bikini contest which was won by Torrie Wilson. After winning the contest, Joy and her fellow Smackdown wrestlers would become involved in brief feuds with Dawn Marie and Melina.

Following these feuds, she occasionally appeared on SmackDown! during backstage segments with other wrestlers or occasional bikini and lingerie contests, including one on April 7, where she and other wrestlers competed in a Vivas Las Vegas bikini match, which Torrie also won. She was released from her contract due to budget cuts on July 6, 2005.

Giovanni returned at WWE's WrestleMania 25, making her official in-ring debut in a 25-Diva Battle Royal to determine the first Miss WrestleMania alongside various other past and present WWE Divas but was eliminated second by The Bella Twins.

Other media

Giovanni won the 2001 L.A. Model Expo. She competed in the 2004 and 2005 Lingerie Bowl events. She was also a panelist for the G4 show Video Game Vixens. In 2004 and 2005, respectively, she appeared in the films Instinct vs. Reason and When All Else Fails. Giovanni had a role in Avenged Sevenfold's music video, Beast and the Harlot in 2006. In 2007, Giovanni starred in the film Pretty Cool Too as June.
In preparation for WrestleMania 21, Giovanni took part in numerous promo videos, including a Taxi Driver parody.

Video game
Giovanni appears as a playable character in WWE SmackDown! vs. Raw 2006 on the women's division roster.

Personal life

Giovanni is of Italian descent. Since January 2010, she is now working an internship for a chiropractor in Los Angeles, California. She also recently got recertified in massage therapy for a new business venture she is working on.  In 2014 she started a massage therapy business in San Diego, California.

Giovanni has a son, who was born on October 20, 1998.

Championships and accomplishments
World Wrestling Entertainment
2005 SmackDown! Rookie Diva of the Year Contest

References

External links

 Joy Giovanni on Twitter
 
 Online World of Wrestling Profile
 Joy Giovanni Superstar page
 Joy Giovanni on Internet Wrestling Database
 Joy Giovanni's Instagram Page 
 Joy Giovanni's Official Website
 

Female models from Massachusetts
American film actresses
American female professional wrestlers
American professional wrestlers of Italian descent
Legends Football League players
Living people
People from Greater Los Angeles
Professional wrestling managers and valets
WWE Diva Search contestants
1978 births
Professional wrestlers from Massachusetts
21st-century American women
21st-century professional wrestlers